Chiu Jeng-jiann is a Taiwanese politician. He is currently the Deputy Minister of Science and Technology since 20 May 2016.

Early life
Chiu obtained his bachelor's degree in mechanical engineering from Chung Yuan Christian University in 1986 and doctoral degree in aeronautics and astronautics from National Cheng Kung University in 1992.

References

Living people
Ministers of Science and Technology of the Republic of China
Year of birth missing (living people)
Chung Yuan Christian University alumni